Justice Carmody may refer to:

David W. Carmody (1908–1976), associate justice of the New Mexico Supreme Court
John Carmody (judge) (1854–1920), associate justice of the North Dakota Supreme Court